National Highway 10 was a National Highway, length , in North India that originated at Delhi and ended at the town of Fazilka in Punjab near the Indo-Pak Border.

New numbering 
Due to Rationalization of Numbering Systems of National Highways by  Ministry of Road Transport and Highways, old NH 10 has been renumbered as follows.

 Fazilka - Abohar - Malout section is part of new National Highway No. 7
 Malout - Sirsa - Hisar - Delhi section is part of new National Highway No. 9

Upgrades

Four-laning between Hissar and Rohtak
As of 2016 June, a special purpose vehicle, Rohtak-Hissar Tollway Pvt Ltd, completed the widening of the stretch from Hissar to Rohtak to four lanes (two lanes in each direction with wide paved shoulders and a tree-lined median in the middle). The concession period for the project, including the construction period, is 22 years.

The National Highways Authority of India's National Highways Development Project NHAI NHDP Phase-3 project has acquired additional 591.84 hectares of land for road widening and building:
 2 toll road plazas:
 Near Hansi, towards Hisar
 Between Maham and Rohtak
 3 overbridges:
 Hisar-Jakhal Railway line near Hisar
 Foot over-bridge near Hisar Cantt.) 
 Jind-Rohtak railway line near Rohtak
 13 underpasses
 6 pedestrian underpasses in the connecting villages
 7 vehicular underpasses in the connecting villages
 5 bypasses
 Hansi bypass
 Maham bypass
 Kharkada bypass
 Madina bypass
 Rohtak South-West NH10 bypass across NH 71

Four-laning between Hisar to Sirsa and Dabwali

The project for widening Hisar-Sirsa-Dabwali segments in Haryana to four lanes on Build–operate–transfer (BOT) toll road mode is on a design, built, finance, operate and transfer (DBFOT) pattern with a concession period of 24 years including a 2.5 years construction period. The project was started in 2015 and is progressing at a good pace. The project is expected to be completed on time. It also covers the following:
 1 railway over-bridge (ROB)
 10 flyovers
 1 major bridges
 11 minor bridge
 Sirsa bypass

Safety
Safety improvements undertaken by NHAI and PWD since 2012 have resulted in a decline in road fatalities on NH10. Scheduled improvements include rumble strips, additional signage, and reflective markers.

Popular media
The Bollywood thriller movie NH10 produced by Anushka Sharma is based on a story of travel on the National Highway 10. However, the condition of the highway is much better than as compared to what was shown in the movie, and it does not pass through Gurgaon.

References

External links
 Old NH 10 on OpenStreetMap
 Map of NH-10

10
10
10
National highways in India (old numbering)